The Johnsonburg Area School District is a diminutive, rural, public school district serving parts of Elk County, Pennsylvania. It encompasses the communities of Johnsonburg, Ridgway Township, and Jones Township. Johnsonburg Area School District encompasses . According to 2000 federal census data, it serves a resident population of 7,526. In 2009, the district residents’ per capita income was $16,810, while the median family income was $42,131. In the Commonwealth, the median family income was $49,501 and the United States median family income was $49,445, in 2010. The district operates one elementary school and one junior/senior high school.

Extracurriculars
The district offers a variety of clubs, activities and an extensive sports program.

Extracurriculars
The district offers the following:
Drama Club
FFA (Future Farmers of America)
French Club
National Honor Society
Photography Club
Stand Tall
Varsity Club
Student Council
Yearbook Club

Sports
The District funds:

Boys
Baseball - A
Basketball- A
Cross Country - A
Football - A
Golf - AA
Soccer - A
Tennis - AA
Track and Field - AA
Wrestling	 - AA

Girls
Basketball - A
Cross Country - A
Softball - A
Girls' Tennis - AA
Track and Field - AA
Volleyball

Junior high school sports

Boys
Basketball
Cross Country
Football
Track and Field
Wrestling	

Girls
Basketball
Cross Country
Track and Field
Volleyball 

According to PIAA directory July 2012

References

School districts in Elk County, Pennsylvania